The men's 110 metres hurdles event at the 1987 Pan American Games was held in Indianapolis, United States on 15 August.

Results
Wind: +4.4 m/s

References

Athletics at the 1987 Pan American Games
1987